Araegeus is a genus of African jumping spiders that was first described by Eugène Louis Simon in 1901.  it contains only two species, found only in Africa: A. fornasinii and A. mimicus.

References

Salticidae genera
Salticidae
Spiders of Africa